Djimi Traoré (born 1 March 1980) is a former professional footballer and was an assistant coach for Seattle Sounders FC. He played as a left back or centre back. Born in France, Traoré was a member of the Malian national team and at club level, he played for Laval, Liverpool – with whom he won multiple honours including the 2004–05 Champions League – Lens, Charlton Athletic, Portsmouth, Rennes, Birmingham City, Monaco, Marseille, and Seattle.

Club career

Liverpool
Traoré started his career at home club Laval before moving on to Liverpool.

He spent the 2003–04 season, Houllier's last at the club, in the reserve team, of which he was captain, and almost left Liverpool for their Merseyside neighbours Everton on the 2004 transfer deadline day but remained at Liverpool. He scored his first and what turned out to be his only Liverpool goal during this season, in the UEFA Cup against FC Steaua București.
Traoré's career appeared to have been revitalised by Rafael Benítez. While the defender had appeared poor positionally, and seemed reluctant to attack, particularly during the 2004–05 season, he showed more willingness to support the left winger, as well as improving his positional play.

Traoré scored an own goal in the third round of the 2004–05 FA Cup against then Championship side Burnley, as he attempted a turn and drag-back within his own six-yard box.
It turned out to be the only goal of the game and handed Burnley a 1–0 victory over their Premiership opponents.

Traoré remained a regular at Liverpool, and eventually made the starting line-up as Liverpool qualified for the 2005 Champions League Final against Milan. After conceding the free kick that led to Paolo Maldini's goal in the opening minute, In the second half his play improved, and a goalline clearance to deny Shevchenko a likely winner contributed to his winning a Champions League medal as Liverpool fought back from 3–0 down to draw 3–3 and beat Milan 3–2 on penalties.

In the 2005–06 season, Traoré found his first team appearances limited, with John Arne Riise and Stephen Warnock also starting regularly at left back. It was to be his last season with Liverpool, and, although he had played some part in Liverpool's pre-season in 2006, he was sold to Charlton Athletic for £2 million on 8 August 2006.

Charlton Athletic and Portsmouth
Traoré was sent off on his Addicks debut on 19 August, after receiving two yellow cards, the latter of which was for preventing a free kick being taken. This was the fifth time in eight seasons a Charlton player had been sent off in the first game of the season. On 16 December he conceded a penalty against Liverpool, his former club, for a tackle on Jermaine Pennant. He was soon deemed surplus to requirements at Charlton. After only half a season at the Valley, Traoré was allowed to leave the club by new manager Alan Pardew, joining Portsmouth.

Birmingham City (loan)
On 10 February 2009 Traoré joined Birmingham City, then of the Football League Championship, on a three-month emergency loan. He sustained a hamstring injury later the same month, and finally made his debut for the club in April as a late substitute against Watford.

Monaco
On 18 June 2009 Traore signed a two-year deal with Monaco, moving from Portsmouth after his loan period at Birmingham expired.

Marseille
On 18 August 2011 Traoré signed a one-year contract with Ligue 1 club Olympique de Marseille. He was an unused substitute as Marseille won the 2012 Coupe de la Ligue Final, and left the club at the end of the season.

Seattle Sounders FC
On 23 February 2013 Traoré signed with MLS club Seattle Sounders FC after a successful preseason trial. He scored his first goal for the club in spectacular fashion, a  volley off the underside of the crossbar, during a CONCACAF Champions League quarterfinal match against Tigres. Traoré's goal equalized their Champions League match with Tigres 2–2 on aggregate, and preceded Eddie Johnson's 75th-minute game-winning goal, allowing the Sounders to become the first MLS club to eliminate a Mexican side in the history of the CONCACAF Champions League. Traoré's first ever league goal came on 8 May 2013 as the Sounders beat Sporting Kansas City 1–0 in Kansas City.  The goal was a game-winning volley in the 94th minute to give the Sounders just their second win of the 2013 season in their first eight games. Traoré retired at the end of the 2014 season. Traoré was an assistant coach with the team until 12 August 2021.

Club statistics

Honours
Liverpool
 UEFA Champions League: 2004–05
 FA Cup: 2005–06
 Football League Cup: 2002–03; runner-up 2004–05
 FA Charity Shield: 2001; runner-up 2002
FIFA Club World Championship runner-up: 2005

Marseille
 Coupe de la Ligue: 2011–12

Seattle Sounders FC
 MLS Supporters' Shield: 2014

References

External links
 
 
 
 Profile, stats & pics of Djimi Traoré
 
 Djimi Traoré at Sitercl.com
 

1980 births
Living people
French people of Malian descent
People from Saint-Ouen-sur-Seine
Footballers from Seine-Saint-Denis
Malian footballers
French footballers
Association football defenders
Stade Lavallois players
Liverpool F.C. players
RC Lens players
Charlton Athletic F.C. players
Portsmouth F.C. players
Stade Rennais F.C. players
Birmingham City F.C. players
AS Monaco FC players
Olympique de Marseille players
Seattle Sounders FC players
Ligue 2 players
Premier League players
Ligue 1 players
English Football League players
Major League Soccer players
UEFA Champions League winning players
UEFA Cup winning players
Mali international footballers
Malian expatriate footballers
Malian expatriate sportspeople in England
Malian expatriate sportspeople in the United States
French expatriate footballers
French expatriate sportspeople in England
French expatriate sportspeople in the United States
Expatriate footballers in England
Expatriate soccer players in the United States
Seattle Sounders FC non-playing staff